This article details the Warrington Wolves RLFC's 2014 season. The Wolves have been present in all previous Super League seasons dating back to 1996. This year they are competing in Super League XIX and the 2014 Challenge Cup.

Preseason 

Warrington played their annual Festive Derby friendly against the Widnes Vikings in late 2013, snatching a 36-32 victory in a close-fought contest. In the new year, the Wolves completed a three-week training camp in Australia, including sessions with NRL clubs Sydney Roosters, Manly Sea Eagles and Canterbury Bulldogs. They played two more friendlies upon returning to England, beating Championship side Leigh Centurions 34-20 at Leigh Sports Village and facing off against newly reformed Salford Red Devils a few days later, battling to a 14-8 victory in their first home fixture of 2014.

Super League XIX – regular season

The Wolves faced a challenging start to the season, with their opening three fixtures all replays of 2013 losses. History repeated itself against St Helens R.F.C. at home and Leeds Rhinos away in Rounds 1 and 2 respectively, bringing about Warrington's worst start since the 2009 season. However, a gritty 18-16 win at home to Hull F.C. followed by two consecutive away wins to 2013's bottom teams, London Broncos and Salford Red Devils got their season under way with some points on the board. Next came a replay of the 2013 Grand Final against the Wigan Warriors, where an error-strewn performance in wet and windy conditions led to further disappointment for the Wolves in a 12-4 loss to the reigning champions. The next round brought a visit to Huddersfield, where the Wire trailed 14-4 at half time to the Giants. However, an outstanding second half fightback and five unanswered tries secured a 33-14 Wolves win - their tenth in a row against the Huddersfield Giants in all competitions. Next up was a double fixture against Hull Kingston Rovers. Warrington successfully booked a place in the 5th Round of the 2014 Challenge Cup in their visit to the Craven Park, however five days later when they hosted the Robins at the Halliwell Jones Stadium, they lost 12-25. A modest 4 wins from the first 8 rounds of Super League.

At home to the Widnes Vikings, Warrington put on an impressive show for the Sky cameras, securing a comprehensive 44-6 win against their local derby rivals. Despite seemingly returning to form, the following two fixtures of Super League saw the Wolves slip down the ladder with back to back away defeats in the league. Castleford Tigers, the early surprise package of 2014, ended an 8 match losing streak against the Wire in style with a 40-6 win. A visit to the Odsal then brought about a shock result as the struggling Bradford Bulls utterly out-enthused the Wolves in a topsy-turvy game which culminated in a 34-28 win for the Bulls. Warrington effectively bounced back from this setback however, finding a good bit of form with a new combination of Chris Bridge and Stefan Ratchford at half-back, with Richie Myler out with a shoulder injury.

What followed was a spectacular 11-match unbeaten run in all competitions, amongst which Warrington thoroughly reasserted themselves as contenders in 2014 with impressive wins over top teams St Helens and Leeds Rhinos. At the end of July came a dip in form where Warrington suffered two consecutive Super League losses; for the second year running they were beaten away by their derby rivals Widnes and the following week saw the emphatic homecoming of Chris Riley (who played only one match for Warrington in 2014 before being sent on loan) whose hat-trick in Wakefield colours consolidated a 28-40 home loss and a drop to 6th in the table.

August arrived and the Wolves travelled to Perpignan to take on the Catalans Dragons who had only lost one of their ten home games so far in the 2014 season. After an epic battle in stormy conditions - lightning striking overhead throughout the match - Warrington snatched the win by 2 points, thanks to Bridge's faultless kicking game. Upon their return to England and Challenge Cup action, Warrington for the second year running fell at the last hurdle of the race to Wembley in a 16-24 loss to the Leeds Rhinos.

In the final four games of the regular season, the Wolves faced a string of tough games against each of what would finish the Top 5 of Super League. Firstly a Castleford side stripped down in preparation for a trip to Wembley was disposed of convincingly at the Halliwell Jones. Two weeks later Warrington took on Huddersfield and, in a fightback not quite reminiscent of the reverse fixture earlier in the season, earned a 24-all draw from 23-6 down. And with that the Wolves' ten-match winning run against the Giants became an eleven-match unbeaten run. The following week Wire produced their best 80-minute performance of the season to dispatch the league leaders St Helens 39-12 on their own patch. The final game of the regular season was a loss at Wigan in a chilling repeat of the previous year's Grand Final where Warrington took a convincing 18-4 lead only to concede four unanswered tries and eventually lose 24-20.

Due to the unprecedented competitiveness of this year's Super League, Warrington could have finished anywhere between 2nd and 5th in the table going into the last game of the season. As it was, Warrington let an 18-4 lead slip, losing 24-20 at the DW Stadium and dropping to 5th. The Wolves has qualified for the play-offs for the fifth year in a row but unlike the previous four years finishing outside the top 4 meant there would be no second chances; Warrington were straight into knock-out territory entering the play-offs.

Super League XIX – play-off series

2014 Tetley's Challenge Cup

References
 

Warrington Wolves seasons
Warrington Wolves season